Douglas or Doug Clark may refer to:

Arts
Douglas Clark (poet) (1942–2010), English poet
Douglas Clark (sculptor), American sculptor
Doug Clark (died 2002), leader of Doug Clark and the Hot Nuts

Politics
Doug Clark (Arizona politician), American politician 
Doug Clark (Australian politician) (1927–2008)

Sports
Douglas Clark (rugby league) (1891–1951), British rugby league footballer, wrestler and World War One veteran
Doug Clark (baseball) (born 1976), American baseball player

Other people
Doug Clark (serial killer) (born 1948), American serial killer
Doug Clark (investor), American real estate investor
Douglas Alan Clark (1917–2012), American recipient of the Navy Cross

See also 
 Douglas Clarke (disambiguation)